Helium-weak stars are chemically peculiar stars which have a weak helium lines for their spectral type. Their helium lines place them in a later (ie. cooler) spectral type then their hydrogen lines.

List of helium-weak stars 

This is a non-extensive list of helium-weak stars.

 HR 939
 HR 1100
 HR 1121
 HR 1441
 HR 2509
 HR 3448
 HR 4801
 HR 8137
Theta Hydri
HD 34797
HD 35456

Helium-strong star
A related class of stars have anomalously-strong helium lines in their spectra, and are known as helium-strong stars.

See also 
 Helium star
 Extreme helium star

References 

 
Star types